The 2010–11 season will be the 47th season in Bursaspor's existence, and their fourth consecutive year in the top-flight of Turkish football, and will cover the period from 1 July 2010 to 30 June 2011. The club qualified for the UEFA Champions League after being crowned champions in the 2009–10 domestic season. They will enter at the group stage. Their previous encounters in Europe have come in the 1986–87 European Cup Winners' Cup and the 1995 UEFA Intertoto Cup, where they went out in the quarter-finals.

Team kit
The team kit for the 2010–11 season is produced by Puma and the shirt sponsor is Digiturk. The home kit will be in the traditional green colour and the away kit will be all white.

Pre-season
Bursaspor began their pre-season training on 28 July 2010 at their training camp in Bad Tatzmannsdorf, Austria. Bursaspor's training schedule consisted of preseason friendly matches against games against Iranian club Steel Azin on 13 July in Oberschützen, a 1-0 win against Stoke City on 15 July in Irdning, a 2–2 draw against Red Star Belgrade on 18 July in Gleisdorf and a 1–1 draw against Borussia Dortmund in Rudersdorf on 21 July.

Current squad

Transfers

In

Summer

Winter

Loan

Out

Summer

Winter

Loan

Statistics

Goal scorers
Includes all competitive matches. The list is sorted by shirt number when total goals are equal.

Last updated on 14 September

Records

Doubles achieved

Biggest winning margin

Current staff

Classification

Bursaspor's fourth consecutive season in the Süper Lig began on 15 August 2010 and is due to end on 9 May 2011.

League table

League results summary

Results by round

Matches

Turkish Cup

Bursaspor finished third in their Group D of the Turkish Cup, winning and drawing one game and losing two games. They did not qualify for the knockout rounds.

Cup matches

UEFA Champions League

By virtue of winning the 2009–10 Süper Lig, Bursaspor have automatically qualified for the group stage of the tournament. The draw for the group stage was held on the 26 August 2010 in Monaco; Bursaspor have been drawn in Group C alongside Manchester United, Valencia and Rangers.

Group stage

Results by round

Group C

References

External links
Bursaspor official site
2010–11 Bursaspor season at Soccerway

2010-11
Turkish football clubs 2010–11 season
2010–11 UEFA Champions League participants seasons